Bishop Wasyl Ihor Medwit, O.S.B.M. (born 23 July 1949) is a Polish-born Ukrainian Greek Catholic hierarch, Titular Bishop of Hadriane since 30 March 1994. He is currently retired. Before it, from 30 March 1994 until 30 September 1996 he served as an Auxiliary Bishop of Lviv, from 30 September 1996 until 8 November 2002 as Apostolic Visitor in Kazakhstan and the Middle Asia, from 20 September 1997 until 6 December 2004 as an Archiepiscopal Exarch of Kyiv-Vyshhorod, from 6 December 2004 until 17 March 2009 as a Curial Bishop of the Kyiv-Halych and from 17 March 2009 until 25 October 2013 as an Auxiliary Bishop of Donetsk-Kharkiv.
.

Life
Bishop Medwit was born in the family of ethnic Ukrainian Greek-Catholics in Przemyśl, in post-war Poland. After the statal education, he subsequently joined the Order of Saint Basil the Great, where he had a profession on 2 February 1980 and a solemn profession on 1 January 1984. Medwit was ordained as priest on 31 May 1984, after theological studies in Rome.

He remained in Italy and served as a vice-rector in the Ukrainian Pontifical College of Saint Josaphat (1984–1986). After his returning in Poland and a service as a parish priest, he was elected as a Protohegumen (Provincial Superior) of the Bazilians in Poland (1989–1994).

On 30 March 1994 Fr. Medwit was confirmed by Pope John Paul II and on 12 July 1994 consecrated to the Episcopate as auxiliary bishop. The principal consecrator was Cardinal Myroslav Ivan Lubachivsky, the Head of the Ukrainian Greek Catholic Church.

References

External links

1949 births
Living people
People from Przemyśl
Polish people of Ukrainian descent
Polish Eastern Catholics
Eastern Catholic bishops in Ukraine
20th-century Eastern Catholic bishops
21st-century Eastern Catholic bishops
Bishops of the Ukrainian Greek Catholic Church
Order of Saint Basil the Great